Roman Catholic Archdiocese of Mérida may refer to the following Latin Catholic archbishoprics with sees called Mérida :

 the present Roman Catholic Archdiocese of Mérida-Badajoz, in Spain, after which city colonial ones were named
 the Roman Catholic Archdiocese of Mérida in Venezuela

See also 
 [Mérida]